Anne Marie Coyle is a judge at the Philadelphia County Court of Common Pleas in Philadelphia County, Pennsylvania. She was elected to the Philadelphia County Court of Common Pleas on November 5, 2013 for a tenure of ten years (2023).

References 

Living people
Villanova University School of Law alumni
American women judges
Year of birth missing (living people)
Judges of the Pennsylvania Courts of Common Pleas
21st-century American women